Fusus pazi is a species of sea snail, a marine gastropod mollusk in the family Fasciolariidae, the spindle snails, the tulip snails and their allies.

This is a nomen dubium.

Description
The length of the shell attains 40 mm, its diameter 15 mm.

Distribution
Habitat unknown.

References

 Fischer-Piette, E., 1950. Listes des types décrits dans le Journal de Conchyliologie et conservés dans la collection de ce journal. Journal de Conchyliologie 90: 8-23

External links
 Crosse, H., 1859. Descriptions de coquilles nouvelles. Journal de Conchyliologie 7: 380-384

pazi
Gastropods described in 1859